Tsvetana Dianova Mancheva (born 22 May 1985) is a Bulgarian footballer who plays as a midfielder for Women's Championship club WFC Beroe Stara Zagora. She has been a member of the Bulgaria women's national team.

References

1985 births
Living people
Women's association football midfielders
Bulgarian women's footballers
Bulgaria women's international footballers
WFC Beroe Stara Zagora players